Khallari Legislative Assembly constituency is one of the 90 Legislative Assembly constituencies of Chhattisgarh state in India.

It is part of Mahasamund district.

Members of the Legislative Assembly

Election results

2018

See also
 List of constituencies of the Chhattisgarh Legislative Assembly
 Mahasamund district

References

Mahasamund district
Assembly constituencies of Chhattisgarh